The Minister of Human Settlements, Water and Sanitation is a Minister in the Cabinet of South Africa. From May 2019 to August 2021, the Minister was Lindiwe Sisulu and the Deputy Ministers Pam Tshwete and David Mahlobo. The mission of the Department of Human Settlements is "To facilitate the creation of sustainable Human Settlements and improved quality of household life.”

References

External links
Department of Human Settlements

Lists of political office-holders in South Africa